Guardian Messenger is a weekly suburban newspaper in Adelaide, part of the Messenger Newspapers group. The Guardian's area is bounded by Hallett Cove  in the south, Main South Road to the east, the airport, and the coastline. The newspaper generally reports on events of interest in its distribution area, including the suburbs of Glenelg, Marion, Hallett Cove and Morphettville. It also covers the City of Holdfast Bay, City of Marion and City of West Torrens councils.

History 
The Glenelg Guardian was established in 1913. For much of this time, it was owned by the Smedley family of Glenelg. One-time editor of the Glenelg Guardian, Alan Smedley, became the Glenelg mayor.

In June 1951, the Glenelg Guardian incorporated the 4-page Kangaroo Island Courier, a weekly newspaper issued on the island on Saturdays. The first issue of the Courier was on 2 November 1907, with the last being 25 May 1951 (Vol. XLIV, No.19), when subscribers were informed of the benefits of the merger. A later insert version, The K.I. Courier (1957-1968), was also published by the Glenelg Guardian, and sold to its rival publication The Islander.

In 1964, the paper was acquired by Messenger owner Roger Baynes and renamed The Guardian and Retailer. In 1984, the paper was renamed Guardian Messenger. By 2007, it has a circulation of 70,162 and a readership of 83,000.

References

External links 
 Messenger Newspapers
 Guardian Messenger
 Guardian Messenger - Digital edition
 
 

Newspapers published in Adelaide
Weekly newspapers published in Australia
Newspapers on Trove